Zhang Yuhuan (born 27 September 1926) is a Chinese architectural historian who is a researcher at the Institute for History of Natural Sciences, Chinese Academy of Sciences. He is internationally known for his studies on ancient Chinese architecture.

Biography
Zhang was born in Shulan County, Jilin, on 27 September 1926, during the Republic of China, while his ancestral home in Yuci District of Jinzhong, Shanxi. He secondary studied at the Fifth National High School of Jilin Province. In 1945, he enrolled at Northeastern University, where he majored in architecture. After graduating in 1951, he stayed at the university and taught there. Soon after, he was despatched to the Ministry of Heavy Industry of the Central People's Government. In 1953, he studied architecture under Professor Liang Sicheng at the Research Office of Chinese Ancient Architectural Theory and History, in co-operation with by the Chinese Academy of Sciences and Tsinghua University. In 1968, he was transferred to the Institute for History of Natural Sciences, Chinese Academy of Sciences as a researcher. In October 2011, he joined the Communist Party of China at the age of 85. On 18 July 2012, he was recruited by Kaifeng Municipal Government as a cultural consultant.

Publications

References

1926 births
Living people
People from Shulan
Chinese historians
Northeastern University (China) alumni
Academic staff of the Northeastern University (China)
Chinese architectural historians